Crusoe Kurddal (1960/1961 - 2020) was an Aboriginal Australian artist known for his Mimih and Yawkyawk sculptures, and acting roles.

Biography 
Crusoe Kurddal is an artist, dancer, singer and actor who lives and works in Maningrida, an aboriginal community in central Arnhem Land of the Northern Territory of Australia. Kurddal's work is known for its inclusion of Mimih figures, and he inherited the right to paint these figures from his late father, Crusoe Kuningbal. Mimih are tall, slender spirits that live in the plateau of Arnhem Land. Kurddal's brother, Owen Yalandja, also inherited the rights to paint Mimih figures, and the two brothers continue to make sculptures of Mimih figures in the vein of their late father's artwork. Presently, Kurddal has been making sculptures of Yawkyawk figures for ceremonial purpose and also sale. Along with working as a visual artist, Kurddal was also an actor, and he starred in the 2006 film Ten Canoes as Ridjimiraril.

Artistic career 
Crusoe Kurddal started his artistic career with Mimih spirits as his primary subject matter. Originally from the Maningrida region of central Arnhem Land, the stories and depictions of the Mimih have been around locally for many years but sculptures are newer. The mimih are spirits from the rock country that are thought to be long, skinny beings that live and move within the cracks of the rocks. Mimih sculptures are usually carved from thin trunks of softwood trees. The body forms have humorous insinuation to them because of many stories. Traditionally Mimih's had traditional rarrk designs, but Kurddal's father utilised small dots and passed it down to his sons.

Later, Crusoe Kurddal switched to sculpting Yawkyawk figures. Yawkyawks are similar to mermaids with the head of a woman and the body of a fish. He carved his sculptures out of wooden poles. Kurrdal made the switch to Yawkyawk figures because he believed they were more easily understood by non-Indigenous viewers as compared to his previous works that depicted sacred ceremonial iconography.

Influences 
Crusoe Kurddal's father, Crusoe Kuningbul, heavily influenced his work. Kunningbul was born in the Middle Liverpool River region, and during WWII he moved to Milingimbi. After the war, he began bark painting at Maningrida, but he finally relocated to Barrihdjowkkeng where he ultimately raised Crusoe and his brothers Owen Yalandja and Tim Wulanibirr. Throughout his prolific career, Kuningbul depicted Mimih spirits through sculptures and in bark paintings. Kunningbul was the first artist to depict Mimih figures in sculptural form, and he created these figures from 1968 until his death in 1984. Kunningbul also performed traditional dances and songs, and sometimes, he performed alongside his Mimih sculptures in Kuninjku trade ceremonies called Mamurrng — the sculptures were specifically developed for these ceremonies. Mamurrng ceremonies are traditional ceremonies that celebrate male births. After Kunningbul's death, Kurddal and his brother Owen Yalandja inherited the right to create Mimih sculptures from Kunningbul. Kurddal's 1985 sculpture entitled Mimih Spirit serves as an example of one of Kurddal's Mimih sculptures that continues in the vein of Kuningbul's artwork. Kurddal began to make Mimih sculptures that are significantly larger in scale than his father-s in the mid-1980s.

Legacy 
Crusoe Kurddal's father—Crusoe Kuningbal—Kurdddal himself, and Owen Yalandja pioneered the creation of Mimih sculptures, but their bodies of work influenced the work of succeeding aboriginal artists. Since the 1980s, other Kuninjku people have been producing sculptures of similar figures because of Kuningbal and, later, his sons; however, Kurddal and Yalandja made the most innovative strides.

Acting roles 
In 2006, Crusoe Kurddal played the leading role as Ridjimiraril in Rolf de Heer's Ten Canoes. It was the first movie filmed entirely using Australian Aboriginal languages and is a moral tale set in Arnhem Land. Ten Canoes was a critically acclaimed film, winning Best Film at the Australian Film Institute Awards and Un Certain Regard Special Jury Prize at the 2006 Festival de Cannes. He has also acted in the movies Australia and Mad Max: Fury Road. He was also a musician who acted and created music for the drama The Sleeping Warrior.

Collections 

 Art Gallery of New South Wales
 Gold Coast City Art Gallery
 Museum D'Histoire Naturelle de Lyon, France
 National Gallery of Victoria

Significant exhibitions 

1996-97: Gamarada. Art Gallery of New South Wales, Sydney, 15 Nov 1996–16 Feb 1997
1999-00: Another Country. Art Gallery of New South Wales, Sydney, 04 Jul 1999–02 Apr 2000
2004: Crossing Country: The Alchemy of Western Arnhem Land Art. Art Gallery of New South Wales, Sydney, 24 September 2004 – 12 December 2004
2008-09: Country Culture Community (2008-09). Art Gallery of New South Wales, Sydney, 12 Nov 2008–19 Apr 2009

Death 

Crusoe Kurddal died in 2020.

References

Further reading 

 “Crusoe Kurddal.” Australian National Maritime Museum. Accessed March 30, 2020. http://collections.anmm.gov.au/people/1532/crusoe-kurddal. 
“Crusoe Kurddal.” IMDb. IMDb.com. Accessed March 30, 2020. https://www.imdb.com/name/nm1992004/.
Kohen, Apolline. Dream Tracks: Aboriginal Art of Arnhem Land. Manama, Bahrin: Lafontaine centre of contemporary art, 2006.
Martin, Adrian. “Ten Canoes.” Sight & Sound 17, no. 6 (June 2007).
“Mimih Spirit, (1985) by Crusoe Kurddal.” Art Gallery of New South Wales. Accessed March 30, 2020. https://www.artgallery.nsw.gov.au/collection/works/80.1985/.
Newstead, Adrian, and Ruth Hessey. The Dealer Is the Devil: Adventures in the Aboriginal Art Trade. Blackheath, N.S.W.: Brandl & Schlesinger, 2014.
“Owen Yalandja, Yawkyawk.” NGA Collection. Accessed March 30, 2020. https://artsearch.nga.gov.au/detail.cfm?irn=164761.
Roberts, Rex. “Ten Canoes.” Film Journal International 110, no. 7 (July 2007): 108–9. 
Taylor, Luke, and Graeme K. Ward. The Power of Knowledge, the Resonance of Tradition. Canberra: Aboriginal Studies Press, 2005.
Taylor, Luke. “Inspired by Country.” Wasafiri 23, no. 2 (2008): 30–43. https://doi.org/10.1080/02690050801954278.
Ten Canoes - Meet The Tribe. Accessed March 30, 2020. https://www.metromagazine.com.au/tencanoes/tribe.htm.
“Yawkyawk.” Australian National Maritime Museum. Accessed March 30, 2020. http://collections.anmm.gov.au/objects/21477/yawkyawk?ctx=410bf276-87e5-4d0d-b6a9-46f583789597&idx=0.

1961 births
Australian Aboriginal artists
People from the Northern Territory
Australian contemporary artists
Living people